Scopolamine, also known as hyoscine, or Devil's Breath, is a natural or synthetically produced tropane alkaloid and anticholinergic drug that is formally used as a medication to treat motion sickness and postoperative nausea and vomiting. It is also sometimes used before surgery to decrease saliva. When used by injection, effects begin after about 20 minutes and last for up to 8 hours. It may also be used orally and as a transdermal patch since it has been long known to have transdermal bioavailability. 

Scopolamine is in the antimuscarinic family of drugs and works by blocking some of the effects of acetylcholine within the nervous system.
Scopolamine was first written about in 1881 and started to be used for anesthesia around 1900. Scopolamine is also the main active component produced by certain plants of the nightshade family, which historically have been used as psychoactive drugs (known as deliriants) due to their antimuscarinic-induced hallucinogenic effects in higher doses. In these contexts, its mind-altering effects have been utilized for recreational, criminal and occult purposes. The name "scopolamine" is derived from one type of nightshade known as Scopolia, while the name "hyoscine" is derived from another type known as Hyoscyamus niger. It is on the World Health Organization's List of Essential Medicines.

Medical uses 
Scopolamine has a number of formal uses in modern medicine where it is used in its isolated form and in low doses to treat:
 Postoperative nausea and vomiting.
 Motion sickness, including sea sickness, leading to its use by scuba divers (where it is often applied as a transdermal patch behind the ear)
 Gastrointestinal spasms
 Renal or biliary spasms
 Aid in gastrointestinal radiology and endoscopy
 Irritable bowel syndrome
 Clozapine-induced drooling
 Bowel colic
 Eye inflammation
It is sometimes used as a premedication, (especially to reduce respiratory tract secretions) in surgery, most commonly by injection. Common side effects include sleepiness, blurred vision, dilated pupils, and dry mouth. It is not recommended in people with angle-closure glaucoma or bowel obstruction. Whether its use during pregnancy is safe remains unclear, and use during breastfeeding is still cautioned by health professionals and manufacturers of the drug.

Breastfeeding
Scopolamine enters breast milk by secretion. Although no human studies exist to document the safety of scopolamine while nursing, the manufacturer recommends that caution be taken if scopolamine is administered to a breastfeeding woman.

Elderly
The likelihood of experiencing adverse effects from scopolamine is increased in the elderly, relative to younger people. This phenomenon is especially true for older people who are also on several other medications. Scopolamine use should be avoided in this age group because of these potent anticholinergic adverse effects, which have also been linked to an increased risk for dementia.

Adverse effects
Adverse effect incidence:

Uncommon (0.1–1% incidence) adverse effects include:
 Dry mouth
 Anhidrosis (reduced ability to sweat to cool off)
 Tachycardia (usually occurs at higher doses and is succeeded by bradycardia)
 Bradycardia
 Urticaria (hives)
 Pruritus (itching)

Rare (<0.1% incidence) adverse effects include:
 Constipation
 Urinary retention
 Hallucinations
 Agitation
 Confusion
 Restlessness
 Seizures

Unknown frequency adverse effects include:
 Anaphylactic shock or reactions
 Dyspnea (shortness of breath)
 Rash
 Erythema
 Other hypersensitivity reactions
 Blurred vision
 Mydriasis (dilated pupils)
 Drowsiness
 Dizziness
 Somnolence

Overdose
Physostigmine, a cholinergic drug that readily crosses the blood–brain barrier, has been used as an antidote to treat the central nervous system depression symptoms of a scopolamine overdose. Other than this supportive treatment, gastric lavage and induced emesis (vomiting) are usually recommended as treatments for oral overdoses. The symptoms of overdose include:
 Tachycardia
 Arrhythmia
 Blurred vision
 Photophobia
 Urinary retention
 Drowsiness or paradoxical reaction, which can present with hallucinations
 Cheyne-Stokes respiration
 Dry mouth
 Skin reddening
 Inhibition of gastrointestinal motility

Interactions 
Due to interactions with metabolism of other drugs, scopolamine can cause significant unwanted side effects or unpredictable synergies when taken with other medications or compounds. Specific attention should be paid to other medications in the same pharmacologic class as scopolamine, also known as anticholinergics. These additional compounds could also potentially interact with the metabolism of scopolamine: receptor-binding analgesic/pain medication such as gabapentinoids or opioids, ethanol, cannabinoids, zolpidem, thiazide diuretics, nicotine, benzodiazepines, buprenorphine, and especially anticholinergic drugs such as tiotropium, diphenhydramine, dimenhydrinate, etc. Nicotine in particular likely has a counteracting effect on the effects of scopolamine due to its opposing effect on acetylcholine signaling.

Route of administration
Scopolamine can be taken by mouth, subcutaneously, in the eye, and intravenously, as well as via a transdermal patch.

Pharmacokinetic
Scopolamine undergoes first-pass metabolism and about 2.6% is excreted unchanged in urine. Grapefruit juice decreases metabolism of scopolamine, consequently increasing plasma concentration.

Pharmacodynamics

The pharmacological effects of scopolamine are mediated through the drug’s competitive antagonism of the  peripheral and central muscarinic acetylcholine receptors. Scopolamine acts as a nonspecific muscarinic antagonist at all four (M1, M2, M3, and M4) receptor sites.

In doses higher than intended for medicinal use; the hallucinogenic alteration of consciousness, as well as the deliriousness in particular are tied to the compound’s activity at the M1 muscarinic receptor. M1 receptors are located primarily in the central nervous system and are involved in perception, attention and cognitive functioning. Delirium is only associated with the antagonism of postsynaptic M1 receptors and currently other receptor subtypes have not been implicated. Peripheral muscarinic receptors are part of the autonomic nervous system. M2 receptors are located in the brain and heart, M3 receptors are in salivary glands and M4 receptors are in the brain and lungs. Due to the drug’s inhibition of various signal transduction pathways, the decrease in acetylcholine signaling is what leads to many of the cognitive deficits, mental impairments and delirium associated with psychoactive doses. Medicinal effects appear to mostly be tied to activation of the peripheral receptors and only from marginal decreases in acetylcholine signaling.

Although often broadly referred to as simply being ‘anticholinergic’, antimuscarinic would be more specified and accurate terminology to use for scopolamine, as for instance it is  not known to block nicotinic receptors.

Biosynthesis in plants
Scopolamine is among the secondary metabolites of plants from Solanaceae (nightshade) family of plants, such as henbane (Hyoscyamus niger), jimson weed (Datura), angel's trumpets (Brugmansia), deadly nightshade (Belladonna), mandrake (Mandragora officinarum), and corkwood (Duboisia).

The biosynthesis of scopolamine begins with the decarboxylation of L-ornithine to putrescine by ornithine decarboxylase. Putrescine is methylated to N-methylputrescine by putrescine N-methyltransferase.

A putrescine oxidase that specifically recognizes methylated putrescine catalyzes the deamination of this compound to 4-methylaminobutanal, which then undergoes a spontaneous ring formation to N-methyl-pyrrolium cation. In the next step, the pyrrolium cation condenses with acetoacetic acid yielding hygrine. No enzymatic activity could be demonstrated to catalyze this reaction. Hygrine further rearranges to tropinone.

Subsequently, tropinone reductase I converts tropinone to tropine, which condenses with phenylalanine-derived phenyllactate to littorine. A cytochrome P450 classified as Cyp80F1 oxidizes and rearranges littorine to hyoscyamine aldehyde. In the final step, hyoscyamine undergoes epoxidation catalyzed by 6beta-hydroxyhyoscyamine epoxidase yielding scopolamine.

History
Plants naturally containing scopolamine such as Atropa belladonna (deadly nightshade), Brugmansia (angels trumpet), Datura (Jimson weed), Hyoscyamus niger, Mandragora officinarum, Scopolia carniolica, Latua and Duboisia myoporoides have been known about and used for various purposes in both the New and Old Worlds since ancient times. Being one of the earlier alkaloids isolated from plant sources, scopolamine has been in use in its purified forms (such as various salts, including hydrochloride, hydrobromide, hydroiodide, and sulfate) since its official isolation by the German scientist Albert Ladenburg in 1880, and as various preparations from its plant-based form since antiquity and perhaps prehistoric times. Following the description of the structure and activity of scopolamine by Ladenburg, the search for synthetic analogues, and methods for total synthesis, of scopolamine and atropine in the 1930s and 1940s resulted in the discovery of diphenhydramine, an early antihistamine and the prototype of its chemical subclass of these drugs, and pethidine, the first fully synthetic opioid analgesic, known as Dolantin and Demerol amongst many other trade names.

In 1899, a Dr. Schneiderlin recommended the use of scopolamine and morphine for surgical anaesthesia, and it started to be used sporadically for that purpose. The use of this combination in obstetric anesthesiology (childbirth) was first proposed by Richard von Steinbuchel in 1902 and was picked up and further developed by Carl Gauss in Freiburg, Germany, starting in 1903. The method, which was based on a drug synergy between both scopolamine and morphine came to be known as Dämmerschlaf ("twilight sleep") or the "Freiburg method". It spread rather slowly, and different clinics experimented with different dosages and ingredients; in 1915, the Canadian Medical Association Journal reported, "the method [was] really still in a state of development". It remained widely used in the US until the 1960s, when growing chemophobia and a desire for more natural childbirth led to its abandonment.

Society and culture

Names
Hyoscine hydrobromide is the international nonproprietary name, and scopolamine hydrobromide is the United States Adopted Name. Other names include levo-duboisine, devil's breath, and burundanga.

Australian bush medicine
A bush medicine developed by Aboriginal peoples of the eastern states of Australia from the soft corkwood tree (Duboisia myoporoides) was used by the Allies in World War II to stop soldiers from getting seasick when they sailed across the English Channel on their way to France during the Invasion of Normandy. Later, the same substance was found to be usable in the production of scopolamine and hyoscyamine, which are used in eye surgery, and a multimillion dollar industry was built in Queensland based on this substance.

Recreational and religious use
While it has been occasionally used recreationally for its hallucinogenic properties, the experiences are often unpleasant, mentally and physically. It is also physically dangerous and officially classified as a deliriant drug, so repeated recreational use is rare. In June 2008, more than 20 people were hospitalized with psychosis in Norway after ingesting counterfeit rohypnol tablets containing scopolamine. In January 2018, 9 individuals were hospitalized in Perth, Western Australia, after reportedly ingesting scopolamine. However, the alkaloid scopolamine, when taken recreationally for its psychoactive effect is usually taken in the form of preparations from plants of the genera Datura or Brugmansia, often by adolescents or young adults in order to achieve hallucinations and an altered state of consciousness induced by muscarinic antagonism. In circumstances such as these, the intoxication is usually built on a synergistic, but even more toxic mixture of the additional alkaloids in the plants which includes atropine and hyoscyamine.

Historically, the various plants that produce scopolamine have been used psychoactively for spiritual and magical purposes, particularly by witches in western culture and indigenous groups throughout the Americas such as Native American tribes like the Chumash. When entheogenic preparations of these plants were used, scopolamine was considered to be the main psychoactive compound and was largely responsible for the hallucinogenic effects, particularly when the preparation was made into a topical ointment (most notably flying ointment). Scopolamine is reported to be the only active alkaloid within these plants that can effectively be absorbed through the skin to cause effects. Different recipes for these ointments were explored in European witchcraft at least as far back as the Early Modern period and included multiple ingredients to help with the transdermal absorption of scopolamine (such as animal fat), as well as other possible ingredients to counteract its noxious and dysphoric effects.

In Christianity, although not explicitly designated for ritualistic or spiritual use; in the Bible there are multiple mentions of Mandrake which is a psychoactive and hallucinogenic plant root that contains scopolamine. It was associated with fertility power and (sexual) desire where it was yearned for by Rachel, who apparently was "barren" (infertile) but trying to conceive.

Interrogation
The effects of scopolamine were studied for use as a truth serum in interrogations in the early 20th century, but because of the side effects, investigations were dropped. In 2009, the Czechoslovak state security secret police were proven to have used scopolamine at least three times to obtain confessions from alleged antistate dissidents.

Crime in Colombia
A travel advisory published by the US Overseas Security Advisory Council (OSAC) in 2012 stated: 

Between 1998 and 2004, 13% of emergency-room admissions for "poisoning with criminal intentions" in a clinic of Bogotá, Colombia, have been attributed to scopolamine, and 44% to benzodiazepines. Most commonly, the person has been poisoned by a robber who gave the victim a scopolamine-laced beverage, in the hope that the victim would become unconscious or unable to effectively resist the robbery.

Beside robberies, it is also allegedly involved in express kidnappings and sexual assault. The Hospital Clínic in Barcelona introduced a protocol in 2008 to help medical workers identify cases, while Madrid hospitals adopted a similar working document in February 2015. Hospital Clínic has found little scientific evidence to support this use and relies on the victims' stories to reach any conclusion. Although poisoning by scopolamine appears quite often in the media as an aid for raping, kidnapping, killing, or robbery, the effects of this drug and the way it is applied by criminals (transdermal injection, on playing cards and papers, etc.) are often exaggerated, especially skin exposure, as the dose that can be absorbed by the skin is too low to have any effect. Scopolamine transdermal patches must be used for hours to days. There are certain other aspects of the usage of scopolamine in crimes. Powdered scopolamine is referred to as "devil's breath". In popular media and television, it is portrayed as a method to brainwash or control people into being defrauded by their attackers; there is debate whether these claims are true. It is not verified if the powdered form is capable of inducing a suggestive state. The danger is real enough that in addition to the Overseas Security Advisory Council (OSAC) in 2012, the US Department of State, as well as the Government of Canada, published travel advisories warning travelers about the possibility of targeting. Criminals using Devil’s Breath often use attractive, young women to target men that they believe are wealthy. Nevertheless, the drug is known to produce loss of memory following exposure and sleepiness, similar to the effect of benzodiazepines or alcohol poisoning.

Research 
Scopolamine is used as a research tool to study memory encoding. Initially, in human trials, relatively low doses of the muscarinic receptor antagonist scopolamine were found to induce temporary cognitive defects. Since then, scopolamine has become a standard drug for experimentally inducing cognitive defects in animals. Results in primates suggest that acetylcholine is involved in the encoding of new information into long-term memory. Scopolamine has also been shown to exert a greater impairment on episodic memory, event-related potentials, memory retention and free recall compared to DPH (an anticholinergic and antihistamine). 

Scopolamine produces detrimental effects on short-term memory, memory acquisition, learning, visual recognition memory, visuospatial praxis, visuospatial memory, visuoperceptual function, verbal recall, and psychomotor speed. It does not seem to impair recognition and memory retrieval, though. Acetylcholine projections in hippocampal neurons, which are vital in mediating long-term potentiation, are inhibited by scopolamine. Scopolamine also inhibits cholinergic-mediated glutamate release in hippocampal neurons, which assist in depolarization, potentiation of action potential, and synaptic suppression. Scopolamine's effects on acetylcholine and glutamate release in the hippocampus favor retrieval-dominant cognitive functioning. Scopolamine has been used to model the defects in cholinergic function for models of Alzheimer's, dementia, fragile X syndrome, and Down syndrome.

Scopolamine has been identified as a psychoplastogen, which refers to a compound capable of promoting rapid and sustained neuroplasticity in a single dose. It has been, and continues to be investigated as a rapid-onset antidepressant, with a number of small studies finding positive results, particularly in female subjects.

NASA agreed to develop a nasal administration method. With a precise dosage, the NASA spray formulation has been shown to work faster and more reliably than the oral form to treat motion sickness.

Although a fair amount of research has been applied to scopolamine in the field of medicine, its hallucinogenic (psychoactive) effects as well as the psychoactive effects of other antimuscarinic deliriants hasn’t been extensively researched or as well understood compared to other types of hallucinogens such as psychedelic and disassociative compounds, despite the alkaloid’s long history of usage in mind-altering plant preparations.

References

External links 
 
 

Carboxylate esters
Deliriants
Entheogens
Epoxides
Motion sickness
Muscarinic antagonists
Plant toxins
Tropane alkaloids found in Solanaceae
Tropane alkaloids
Wikipedia medicine articles ready to translate
World Health Organization essential medicines